"Hansel and Gretel" is a 1963 Australian TV adaptation of the opera Hansel and Gretel by Engelbert Humperdinck.

It screened as an episode of Wednesday Theatre in 1966.

Cast
Brian Gilbert as Hansel (to the voice of Marilyn Richardson)
Jacki Weaver as Gretel (to the voice of Janet Rutledge)
Justine Rettick as the Witch
Nita Maughan as the mother
Russell Smith as the father
Margaret Moray as the dew fairy (sung by Chesne Ryman)
Ngaire Thomson as the Sandman (sung by Diane Holmes)

Production
It was an early role for Jacki Weaver who played Gretel and was aged 16; she had just appeared as Cinderella in a pantomime at Philip Street. Brian Gilbert, who played Hansel, was 13. The show was recorded during the visit to Australia of Australian conductor Charles Mackerras. He conducted the Sydney Symphony Orchestra while the opera was videotaped.

It was taped in September.

Reception
Sydney Morning Herald commented on the limitations of the sets but nevertheless called it "an extremely agreeable 90 minutes of tuneful make-believe"

References

External links
 Clip of production at YouTube

1960s Australian television plays
Wednesday Theatre (season 2) episodes